Shoalhaven Heads is a town in Shoalhaven, New South Wales, Australia. It has a fine surfing beach, access to the Shoalhaven River and is surrounded by wineries.

Geography
Shoalhaven Heads is a small rural holiday town. The town sits at the foot of Mount Coolangatta and is situated on both Seven Mile Beach and the mouth of the Shoalhaven River. It is served by the main Bolong Road, which runs from Gerroa to the north, to Bomaderry and Nowra to the south. 

It is bounded by national park to the north, the Shoalhaven River to the south and farm land to the west. The town comprises family homes, weekenders and retirement homes. Shoalhaven Heads also has great modern and suburban houses for families, old couples and young couples.

Population
In the 2016 Census, there were 3,059 people in Shoalhaven Heads. 78.8% of people were born in Australia. The next most common country of birth was England at 5.8%.  91.4% of people spoke only English at home. The most common responses for religion were No Religion 30.8%, Anglican 28.7% and Catholic 19.1%.

Attractions
The town has a primary school, rural fire brigade, doctor's surgery and vets. In terms of shopping there are two grocery stores, a post office, a petrol station (which doubles as a video store and grocery shop), a newsagent, two hairdressers, a cafe, a butcher, a bakery, a pharmacy, a pizza shop, a burger shop, a Chinese takeaway, a pump track, a skate park, and an outdoor public swimming pool. It has one large pub overlooking the river, a sizeable bowls and recreation club which has its own bistro and a golf club adjacent to Seven Mile Beach.

It has several very popular caravan parks (Mountain View Village, Holiday Haven, Coastal Palms Holiday Park and Tall Timbers) offering both static and mobile pitches. It has an outdoor swimming pool, skate ramp and sports field, along with several boat ramps, numerous play-areas and many excellent barbecue/picnic areas.

Nearby there is the historic Coolangatta Estate which was once the home of the pioneer Alexander Berry. Today Coolangatta Estate is a major tourist attraction. It offers accommodation, a golf course, wine tasting rooms, a restaurant and function rooms.

References

External links
 Shoalhaven City Council
 Shoalhaven Heads website
 Shoalhaven Heads Surf Life-Saving Club
 Shoalhaven Heads Bowls & Recreation Club
 St Peter's Anglican Church, Shoalhaven Heads
VISITNSW.com - Shoalhaven

City of Shoalhaven
Towns in New South Wales
Coastal towns in New South Wales